Anastasios Michail (17th century – 1722) was a member of Berlin's Academy of Sciences.

Michail was born in Naousa. He had his general studies in Ioannina with Georgios Sougdouris as his teacher of rhetoric and philosophy. In 1702 he met with distinguished German theologians in Constantinople. Later he went to Halle and was still later elected a member of the Berlin Academy of Sciences. He produced enlightening work for Christians and Greeks in Moscow, where he was renowned for his theological and philosophical knowledge. He was well acquainted with the Greek and Hebrew languages. He died in Russia in 1722.

See also
List of Macedonians (Greek)

External links 
 New Testament version in Modern Greek (Η Καινή Διαθήκη του Κυρίου και Σωτήρος ημών Ιησού Χριστού Μεταφρασθείσα εις κοινήν διάλεκτον, c. 1814)
 L’ Hellenisme Contemporain, Διονύσιος Ζακυθινός, Athens, 1953, "Το σχολείον παράγων της Εθνικής αφυπνίσεως" (in Greek)
 Charalambos A. Minaoglou, "Greek Travellers and Travel Literature from the Fifteenth to the Eighteenth Century" (Χαράλαμπος Α. Μηνάογλου, "Έλληνες Περιηγητές στην Ευρώπη του Διαφωτισμού")

17th-century births
1722 deaths
People from Naousa, Imathia
Greek educational theorists
Greek Macedonians
Michail